Greater Cochin Development Authority (GCDA) is the statutory body overseeing the development of the city of Kochi in the state of Kerala, India.
Headquartered at Kadavanthra, GCDA oversees the development of the major part of Greater Cochin area which consists of the Kochi Municipal Corporation, surrounding municipalities (Thrippunithura, Thrikkakara, Aluva, Kalamassery, Maradu, Eloor, North Paravur, Angamaly and Perumbavoor) and 21 intervening panchayats (Chellanam, Kumbalangi, Cheranelloor, Varappuzha, Chennamangalam, Kadamakkudy, Kadungalloor, Alengad, Chengamanad, Nedumbassery, ezhikkara, Chottanikkara, Choornikkara, Edathala, Kumbalam, Kottuvally and others) covering an area of 632 km2. 

As of 2001, the area has a population of more than 2.5 million. GCDA is one of the two development authorities in Kochi, the other being GIDA which oversees development in the islands towards west of the Kochi mainland, and north of the harbour, covering a total area of 100 km2.

The state government and the GCDA have plans to include Angamaly , Perumbavoor , Piravom and Kolenchery in Ernakulam district; Mala and Kodungallur in Thrissur district; Thalayolaparambu and Vaikom in Kottayam ; and Cherthala in Alappuzha district within the Kochi metropolitan limits. The newly formed metropolis would be put under the charge of a new authority called Kochi Metropolitan Regional Development Authority .

GCDA was the first exclusive agency formed for the development of any urban area in the state of Kerala. This led to the formation of development authorities for other cities in the state. The first of these were TRIDA – the Trivandrum Development Authority. Later development authorities were formed for Kozhikode and Thrissur as well.

Projects

Kochi Marine Drive 

The Marine Drive is one of the most significant projects that GCDA has ever undertaken. The whole of the present Kochi Marine Drive (part of the Kochi Lake, west of the Shanmugham Road to the present Walkway) was claimed from the Kochi Lake in the 1980s. This land underwent several beautification initiatives, especially with the construction of the iconic Rainbow Bridge in 1992. This land later became home for a line of high-rises namely, the GateWay Residency Hotel, the Bay Pride Mall, Kerala Trade Centre etc. A common code for construction is enforced in this stretch of land which includes that the building could be of a maximum 13 storeys, the eastern and western boundaries of the buildings should coincide etc. The sub projects of the Kochi Marine Drive include:
 The Marine Walkway stretching from Subhas Chandra Bose Park in the south, to KSINC Boat Jetty in the north.
 The Rainbow Bridge which is part of the Marine Walkway
 The China Net Bridge which is part of the Marine Walkway
 GCDA Shopping Complex in Marine Drive.
 The Asoka-Tharangini Apartments

Jawaharlal Nehru International Stadium

The largest stadium in Kerala with a seating capacity of 75000, and costed  75 Crore. This is one of the largest projects of the GCDA that was completed ahead of time and well within the budget. The stadium was constructed in 515 days under the leadership of V.J.Thomas IPS, Ex-Chairman, Greater Cochin Development Authority.

Other projects
 Maharaja's College Ground
 Rajendra maidan near Subhas Chandra Bose Park.
 Eastern Terminal of the Ernakulam Junction Railway Station
 Ambedkar Stadium near K.S.R.T.C bus station.
 Panampilly Nagar. The first ever planned urban housing colony in Kerala.
 Gandhi Nagar. Another planned housing colony developed by GCDA.
 Kaloor-Kadavanthra Road (KK Road) connecting Kadavanthra and Kaloor.
 Subhas Chandra Bose Road
 Changampuzha Park, the cultural centre in memory of late poet Sri. Changampuzha, at Edappally.

Infrastructure
The first B.O.T. project in Kerala, the Mattancherry Bridge was coordinated by GCDA. In addition, Kathrikadavu Railway Overbridge and Chilavannur Bund road bridge in Chilavannur puzha have been constructed by GCDA.

In road transport sector, apart from the roads developed as part of area development schemes, in Panampilly Nagar, Gandhi Nagar, Aluva, Rameswaram, and Parur, G.C.D.A has recently completed the 3.2-km long and 22-m wide Kaloor-Kadavanthra road, 15-m wide Subhash Chandra Bose Road, Chilavannur Bund Road (partially completed) and K.P. Vallon Road widening first phase, Panampilly Nagar Anamthuruthy road (partially completed) were taken up by G.C.D.A. Land has been made available to the corporation for the construction of 2-km long & 22-m wide Stadium Link Road, by GCDA by negotiation with the land owners. G.C.D.A. had taken a major role in the implementation of the 22-meter wide & 3 km long Sahodaran Ayyappan Road by getting land surrendered free of cost with the cooperation of Cochin Corporation.

Widening of Kaloor Palarivattom Road was taken up by State P.W.D. with the co-operation of GCDA in getting the land surrendered free of cost for road widening.

To decongest the south Railway Overbridge and to reduce traffic on M.G. Road and Chittoor road the eastern entry to the South Railway station was developed by GCDA. Greater Cochin Development Authority has thus developed a total of about 75 km. of road length of varying widths ranging from 7m to 36m with in the Greater Cochin Region.

Housing sector

 Constructed about 5000 Nos. of dwelling units for different income group within the Greater Cochin Region.
 Housing Loan given to about 15000 families scattered all over the Region.
 700 Houses constructed and allotted to low income families for rehabilitation.
 1700 Nos. of residential plots developed and sold to individuals.135 Acres of land given to different Government / quasi-Government agencies for group housing.

GCDA have developed many planned housing colonies such as Panampilly Nagar, Gandhi Nagar, Kasthurba Nagar, Shastri Nagar, Indira Nagar and Subash Nagar

Controversies
The Indian railways was hesitant to run and use the GCDA owned building at Platform 6 at Ernakulam junction railway station. it is believed to be the reason behind the delay of employing the platform 6 for services. Also the parking area was run by GCDA and the fare differed with the parking area at platform 1.

See also
 Kochi
 Kochi UA
 Corporation of Cochin
 Kingdom of Cochin

References

External links

 Official site of the Greater Cochin Development Authority

Government of Kochi
Economy of Kochi
State urban development authorities of India
State agencies of Kerala
1976 establishments in Kerala
Government agencies established in 1976